Baron Howick of Glendale, of Howick in the County of Northumberland, is a title in the Peerage of the United Kingdom. It was created in 1960 for Sir Evelyn Baring, the former Governor of Kenya. A member of the famous Baring family, he was the third and youngest son of Evelyn Baring, 1st Earl of Cromer, and the great-grandson of Sir Francis Baring, 1st Baronet, the founder of Barings Bank. Baring's uncle was Edward Baring, 1st Baron Revelstoke, the father of Maurice Baring, while other members of the family include Francis Baring, 1st Baron Northbrook, and Alexander Baring, 1st Baron Ashburton.  the title is held by the first Baron's son, the second Baron, who succeeded in 1973.

The family seat is Howick Hall, near Howick, Northumberland.

Barons Howick of Glendale (1960)
Evelyn Baring, 1st Baron Howick of Glendale (1903–1973)
Charles Evelyn Baring, 2nd Baron Howick of Glendale (b. 1937)

The heir apparent is the present holder's son Hon. David Evelyn Charles Baring (b. 1975)
The next heir-in-line is his elder son Felix Charles Alexander Baring (b. 2007)

Family tree

See also
Earl of Cromer
Baron Ashburton (1835 creation)
Baron Northbrook
Baron Revelstoke
Barings Bank

Notes

References
Kidd, Charles, Williamson, David (editors). Debrett's Peerage and Baronetage (1990 edition). New York: St Martin's Press, 1990, 

Baronies in the Peerage of the United Kingdom
Noble titles created in 1960
Howick